Lithuanian Curling Association is a national governing body of curling sport in Lithuania.

In 2005 Lithuanian Curling Association become part of World Curling Federation.

References

External links 
Official website

Biathlon
2002 establishments in Lithuania
Sports organizations established in 2002
Curling governing bodies
Curling in Lithuania